In the 1959 Tour de France, the French team included Jacques Anquetil, Louison Bobet, Raphael Géminiani and Roger Riviere, who were all considered possible Tour winners. This also posed a problem, as they did all want to be team captain, and refused to work for each other.
The Spanish team was headed by Federico Bahamontes, who in previous years did not care for flat stages and time trials, and only tried to win the mountains classification. In the 1959 season, Bahamontes had Fausto Coppi as manager, and Coppi convinced Bahamontes to focus on the general classification. The defending champion Charly Gaul was again placed in a mixed team of Luxembourgian and Dutch cyclists, and expected little support. The Italian team did not include Vito Favero and Gastone Nencini, who had performed well in the 1958 Tour. Their team captain was Ercole Baldini, winner of the 1958 Giro d'Italia, but he was not expected to be able to compete against Gaul, Bahamontes and Anquetil.
Of the cyclists in the French regional teams, Henri Anglade was the most notable. He was included in the Centre-Midi team,

The cyclists were represented by agents, who negotiated for the prices in post-tour criteriums. There were two major agents: Daniel Dousset, who represented Anquetil, Rivière and Bahamontes, and Piel Poulidor, who represented Anglade. This made it more important for Anquetil to help Bahamontes than Anglade.

Teams

 Netherlands/Luxembourg (combined)
 Belgium
 Italy
 France
 Spain
 Switzerland/Germany (combined)
 International
 France Centre-Midi
 France Paris North-East
 France West South-West

Cyclists

By starting number

By team

By nationality

References

1959 Tour de France
1959